Wilmer Allison defeated Sidney Wood 6–2, 6–2, 6–3 in the final to win the men's singles tennis title at the 1935 U.S. National Championships.

Seeds
The tournament used two lists of players for seeding the men's singles event; one for U.S. players and one for foreign players. Wilmer Allison is the champion; others show the round in which they were eliminated.

U.S.
  Wilmer Allison (champion)
  Don Budge (quarterfinals)
  Frank Shields (quarterfinals)
  Sidney Wood (finalist)
  Bryan Grant (semifinals)
  Frank Parker (fourth round)
  Berkeley Bell (first round)
  Gregory Mangin (quarterfinals)

Foreign
  Fred Perry (semifinals)
  Roderich Menzel (fourth round)
  Christian Boussus (first round)
  Enrique Maier (quarterfinals)
  André Martin-Legeay (third round)
  Jacques Brugnon (first round)
  Eskell Andrews (second round)

Draw

Key
 Q = Qualifier
 WC = Wild card
 LL = Lucky loser
 r = Retired

Finals

Earlier rounds

Section 1

Section 2

Section 3

Section 4

Section 5

Section 6

Section 7

Section 8

References

External links
 1935 U.S. National Championships on ITFtennis.com, the source for this draw

Men's Singles
1935